Radio Burgenland is the regional radio for Burgenland and is part of the Österreich 2 group.
It is broadcast by the ORF, and the programs from Radio Burgenland are made in the ORF Burgenland Studio.

External links 
 

Radio stations in Austria
ORF (broadcaster)
Radio stations established in 1967
1967 establishments in Austria